Lincoln County School District, Lincoln County Schools, and variants are the names shared by several school districts in the United States:

Lincoln County School District (Georgia)
Lincoln County Schools (Kentucky)
Lincoln County School District (Mississippi) 
Lincoln County School District (Missouri)
Lincoln County School District (Nevada), school district in Nevada
Lincoln County Schools (North Carolina)
Lincoln County School District (Oregon)
Lincoln County Schools (West Virginia), a school district in West Virginia
Lincoln County School District Number 1, Wyoming
Lincoln County School District Number 2, Wyoming